Line Walker is a 2016 action thriller film adapted from the 2014 TVB series of the same name. Directed by Jazz Boon and starring Nick Cheung, Louis Koo, Francis Ng; Charmaine Sheh, Benz Hui and Au Siu-wai reprised their roles from the original drama. It was released in Hong Kong and Mainland China on 11 August 2016.

Plot 
Inspector Q (Francis Ng) and agent Ding Siu-ka (Charmaine Sheh) are top members of CIB Department, they are after a drug racket that is taking over the city. Unexpectedly, they receive a mystery message from a missing undercover agent "Blackjack". CIB tries to locate and process Blackjack before it's too late. The paranoid drug mafia leader Tung Pak-ho (Li Guangjie) plays his own troop on each other's throats, suspecting a mole. Meanwhile, boss Blue (Nick Cheung) and his right-hand man Shiu Chi-long (Louis Koo) participate in an internal struggle to become the top dogs irrespective of their strong friendship.

After surviving and shooting their way out of a drug deal ambush in Brazil, Rio de Janeiro, it becomes clear that Blue is Blackjack and upon knowing this, Shiu Chi-long tries to protect himself by using Blackjack's identity. They survive doubts and struggles between them but only for Blue to lose his life to an assassin sent by ruthless Tung Pak-ho. Inspector Q's life is lost facing goons and Ding's life is saved by her godfather Foon Hei Gor (Hui Shiu-hung), who is an undercover agent posing as a legendary retired don who is looking to get back into the criminal underworld in the city. Finally, Foon Hei Gor gets Tung Pak-ho arrested after punishing him for what he had done to his wife when Tung Pak-ho started out as a criminal.

Cast 
Nick Cheung as Blue
Louis Koo as Shiu Chi-long
Francis Ng as Q sir/Inspector Q
Charmaine Sheh as Ding Siu-ka
Benz Hui as Foon Hei Gor
Li Guangjie as Tung Pak-ho
Zhang Huiwen as Siu Ying
Xing Yu as sniper / assassin (credited as Shi Yanneng)
Cheng Taishen as Kwok Ming
Moses Chan as police superintendent
Louis Cheung as guy blocking Blue at meeting
Clara Lee as assassin (credited as Clara)

Cameos 
Lo Hoi-pang as guy at company meeting
Bob Lam as Ferrari owner
Cheng Tse-sing as Lin Dongyou
Jade Leung as Karina
Au Siu-wai as Hong Sir
Rebecca Zhu as Samantha, CIB detective
Stephen Wong as CIB detective (credited as Stephen Wong)
Grace Wong as CIB detective
Hugo Wong as Shiu Chi-long's subordinate
Océane Zhu as CIB detective
William Chak as Ng Pak
Sammi Cheung as CIB detective

Reception 
The film grossed  at the Chinese box office. It grossed  worldwide.

Sequel

References

External links 

Line Walker at Yibada
Line Walker at Fandango

Hong Kong action films
Chinese crime drama films
Chinese action films
Shaw Brothers Studio films
2010s Cantonese-language films
2010s Mandarin-language films
Films based on television series
Films directed by Jazz Boon